Tell It Like It Is is the seventh album by American guitarist George Benson featuring performances recorded in 1969 and released on the A&M label.

Reception
The Allmusic review states "Benson manages to transcend the blasting Latin-percussion-spiced production, the tight time limits, and all with often brilliantly tasty guitar fills and brief solos in many styles and three reverb-heavy vocals".

Track listing
 "Soul Limbo" (Booker T. & the M.G.'s) - 3:25
 "Are You Happy" (Theresa Bell, Jerry Butler, Kenneth Gamble) - 2:27 
 "Tell It Like It Is" (George Davis, Lee Diamond) - 2:51
 "Land of 1000 Dances" (Chris Kenner) - 2:48
 "Jackie, All" (Eumir Deodato) - 2:14 
 "Don't Cha Hear Me Callin' to Ya" (Rudy Stevenson) - 3:16 
 "Water Brother" (Don Sebesky) - 2:09
 "My Woman's Good to Me" (Billy Sherrill, Glenn Sutton) - 3:14 
 "Jama Joe" (George Benson) – 3:49 
 "My Cherie Amour" (Stevie Wonder, Henry Cosby, Sylvia Moy) - 3:28 
 "Out in the Cold Again" (Ted Koehler, Rube Bloom) - 2:41

Personnel
George Benson - guitar, vocals
Lew Soloff - trumpet
Arthur Clarke (tracks 1-5), Bob Porcelli (tracks 6, 7 & 9), Hubert Laws (tracks 6, 7 & 9), Jerome Richardson (tracks 1-5, 8, 10 & 11), Joe Farrell (tracks 8, 10 & 11), Joe Henderson (tracks 8, 10 & 11), Sonny Fortune (tracks 1-5) - saxophone
Rodgers Grant (tracks 6, 7 & 9), Richard Tee (tracks 1-5, 8, 10 & 11) - piano
Bob Bushnell (tracks 1-5), Jerry Jemmott (tracks 1-7 & 9), Jim Fielder (tracks 8, 10 & 11) - bass guitar 
Leo Morris - drums
Paul Alicea, Angel Allende, Johnny Pacheco - percussion
Marty Sheller - arranger, conductor
Technical
Pete Turner - photography

References

CTI Records albums
George Benson albums
1969 albums
Albums produced by Creed Taylor
Albums recorded at Van Gelder Studio